Moses Najara II was a Jewish poet, son of Israel Najara, whom he succeeded as rabbi of Gaza. His poetry is praised by his contemporaries, but none of his poems is now extant.

Jewish Encyclopedia bibliography 
 Leser Landshuth, 'Ammude ha-'Abodah;
 David Conforte, Ḳore ha-Dorot;
 Dukes, Gesch. der Neuhebräischen Poesie;
 Moritz Steinschneider, Polemische Literatur, 1868, p. 350;
 Magyar Zsidó Szemle, 1885.

References

External links
 Jewish Encyclopedia article on NAJARA

Jewish poets
Sephardi rabbis in Ottoman Palestine
People from Gaza City
Year of death missing
Year of birth missing